An election of Members of the European Parliament representing Netherlands constituency for the 1999–2004 term of the European Parliament was held on 10 June 1999. It was part of the wider 1999 European election. Eleven parties competed in a D'Hondt type election for 31 seats.

Background

Combined lists
Several parties combined in one list to take part in this European Election and increase their chance on a seat in the European Parliament.
These combined lists are:
 SGP, RPF and GPV

Electoral alliances
No lists formed an electoral alliance.

Numbering of the candidates list

Results

Voter turnout was a record low for a national election of just 30.02%. In the election the GreenLeft performed particularly well quadrupling their seats from one to four. The Socialist Party won its first seat. These gains were made at the cost of the Christian Democratic Appeal, Democrats 66 and the PvdA, which lost one, two and two seats respectively.

Seat assignment

Electoral quota
The electoral quota is the number of votes needed for one seat.
It is the total valid number of votes divided by the number of seats.
For this election it was 3,544,408 valid votes, divided by 31 seats.
The electoral quota was established as: 114,335

Assigning full seats
Full seats are assigned by number of votes divided by the electoral quota.
Electoral alliances are marked as a letter, instead of a number.
Any seats left over are not yet assigned to a specific party.

Remainder seats
The remaining, or left over, seats are awarded sequentially to the lists with the highest average number of votes per seat.
Only lists that reached the electoral quota are eligible.

 CDA – European People's Party is awarded 1 seat.
 GreenLeft is awarded 1 seat.
 SGP, GPV and RPF is awarded 1 seat.
 D66 is awarded 1 seat.

European groups
The EPP-ED group becomes the biggest group this election despite losing seat. This because the ELDR group in the Netherlands lost 2 seats from the Democrats 66. The EG-EFA group makes a big gain in seat, thanks to the win of GreenLeft. The Socialist Party won EUL-NGL its first seat in the Netherlands.

| style="text-align:center;" colspan="11" | 
|-
|style="background-color:#E9E9E9;text-align:center;vertical-align:top;" colspan="3"|European group
!style="background-color:#E9E9E9" |Seats 1994
!style="background-color:#E9E9E9" |Seats 1999
!style="background-color:#E9E9E9" |Change
|-
| 
| style="text-align:left;" | European People's Party–European Democrats
| style="text-align:left;" | EPP-ED
| style="text-align:right;" | 10
| style="text-align:right;" | 9
| style="text-align:right;" | 1 
|-
| style="background-color:gold;" width=0.3em|
| style="text-align:left;" | European Liberal Democrat and Reform Party
| style="text-align:left;" | ELDR
| style="text-align:right;" | 10
| style="text-align:right;" | 8
| style="text-align:right;" | 2 
|-
| 
| style="text-align:left;" | Party of European Socialists
| style="text-align:left;" | PES
| style="text-align:right;" | 8
| style="text-align:right;" | 6
| style="text-align:right;" | 2 
|-
| 
| style="text-align:left;" | The Greens–European Free Alliance
| style="text-align:left;" | Greens-EFA
| style="text-align:right;" | 1
| style="text-align:right;" | 4
| style="text-align:right;" | 3 
|-
| 
| style="text-align:left;" | Europe of Democracies and Diversities
| style="text-align:left;" | EDD
| style="text-align:right;" | 2
| style="text-align:right;" | 3
| style="text-align:right;" | 1 
|-
| 
| style="text-align:left;" | European United Left–Nordic Green Left
| style="text-align:left;" | EUL-NGL
| style="text-align:right;" | 0
| style="text-align:right;" | 1
| style="text-align:right;" | 1 
|-
| 
| style="text-align:left;" | Non-Inscrits
| style="text-align:left;" | NI
| style="text-align:right;" | 0
| style="text-align:right;" | 0
| style="text-align:right;" | 0 
|-
|width="350" style="text-align:right;background-color:#E9E9E9" colspan="3"|
|width="30" style="text-align:right;background-color:#E9E9E9"| 31
|width="30" style="text-align:right;background-color:#E9E9E9"| 31
|width="30" style="text-align:right;background-color:#E9E9E9"| 0 
|}

Elected members 

Below are all the elected members of European parliament for the Netherlands. Members elected by preference votes are in bold. To be elected by preference votes, 10% of the electoral quota is needed.

Source:

Christian Democratic Appeal
 Hanja Maij-Weggen (top candidate), by 591,505 votes
 Wim van Velzen, by 103,743 votes
 Ria Oomen-Ruijten, by 99,584 votes
 Albert Jan Maat, by 34,622 votes
 Arie Oostlander, by 17,628 votes
 Maria Martens, by 16,254 votes
 Karla Peijs, by 11,975 votes
 Bartho Pronk, by 7,929 votes
 Bert Doorn, by 3,598 votes

Labour Party
 Max van den Berg (top candidate), by 584,167 votes
 Ieke van den Burg, by 55,016 votes
 Joke Swiebel, by 12,554 votes
 Jan Marinus Wiersma, by 9,753 votes
 Michiel van Hulten, by 5,710 votes
 Dorette Corbey, by 4,898 votes

People's Party for Freedom and Democracy
 Jan-Kees Wiebenga (top candidate), by 535,904 votes
 Elly Plooij-van Gorsel, by 45,855 votes
 Toine Manders, by 14,237 votes
 Jan Mulder, by 13,825 votes
 Marieke Sanders-ten Holte, by 11,670 votes
 Jules Maaten, by 4,341 votes

GreenLeft
 Joost Lagendijk (top candidate), by 245,642 votes
 Kathalijne Buitenweg, by 90,549 votes
 Theo Bouwman, by 6,012 votes
 Alexander de Roo, by 4,343 votes

SGP, GPV and RPF
 Hans Blokland (GPV) (top candidate), by 245,214 votes
 Bas Belder (SGP), by 20,491 votes
 Rijk van Dam (RPF), by 10,630 votes

Democrats 66
 Lousewies van der Laan (top candidate), by 143,009 votes
 Bob van den Bos, by 8,712 votes

Socialist Party
 Erik Meijer (top candidate), by 124,800 votes

MEPs period 1999–2004
Below is a list of members of the European Parliament for the period 1999–2004 as a result of this election.

References 

Netherlands
European Parliament elections in the Netherlands
1999 elections in the Netherlands